{{Infobox ethnic group
| group            = FindiansFintiaanit
| image            = 
| pop              =  200-9000
| regions          =  
| region2          = 
| languages        = Ojibwe, English language, Fingelska†
| related          = Ojibwe people, Finnish people
}}Findians' (Fin: Fintiaanit) are a people that descend from the mix of Finnish Americans and Indigenous peoples of the Americas, mainly the Ojibwe. Findians today live around the Great Lakes.

The amount of Findians is unknown, but it could be between a few hundred and a few thousand.

 History 
The Findians descend from Finns that immigrated to the United States during 1860–1924 from Finland and the Ojibwe.

When the Ojibwe and Finns met, they taught each other cultural elements, such as hunting skills, and architecture

 Modern status 
The Finnish language is extinct among the Findians. However many of them retain Finnish surnames. Some are also able to speak the Ojibwe language.

 Culture 
Finnish saunas are common in Findian culture, as is the Finnish idea of sisu'' - "stoic determination, tenacity of purpose."

References

Literature

External links 
Fintiaanit (documentary in Finnish)

Finnish American
Ojibwe
Uralic peoples
Native American people